The Catholic Church in the United Kingdom is part of the worldwide Catholic Church in communion with the Pope. While there is no ecclesiastical jurisdiction corresponding to the political union, this article refers to the Catholic Church's geographical representation in mainland Britain as well as Northern Ireland, ever since the establishment of the UK's predecessor Kingdom of Great Britain by the Union of the Crowns in 1707.

History

Anti-Catholicism

Starting with Pope Pius V's papal bull Regnans in Excelsis in 1570 and lasting until 1766, popes did not recognise the legitimacy of the English monarchy and called for its overthrow. The Crown and government responded by treating Catholics as suspect. By the time of the creation of the Kingdom of Great Britain in 1707, Catholics were discriminated against in England and Scotland in significant ways: in all the kingdoms of the British Isles, they were excluded from voting, from sitting in Parliament, and from the learned professions. These discriminatory laws continued after the Acts of Union 1800, which created the new United Kingdom of Great Britain and Ireland in 1801. At that time, Catholic Emancipation was gathering support but was not yet a reality, particularly in Ireland, where the Protestant Ascendancy was still in full force.

The Treaty of Union of 1707, like the Act of Settlement, had stated that no "Papist" could succeed to the throne. Restrictions on the civil rights of Catholics only began to change with the passing of the Papists Act 1778, which allowed them to own property, inherit land and join the British Army, although even this measure resulted in the backlash of the Gordon Riots of 1780, showing the depth of continuing anti-Catholic feeling.

Emancipation

After 1790, a new mood emerged as thousands of Catholics fled the French Revolution and Britain was allied in the Napoleonic Wars with the Catholic states of Portugal and Spain as well as with the Holy See itself. By 1829, the political climate had changed enough to allow Parliament to pass the Roman Catholic Relief Act 1829, giving Catholics almost equal civil rights, including the right to vote and to hold most public offices.

The Catholic Church in England included about 50,000 people in traditional ("recusant") Catholic families. They generally kept a low profile. Their priests usually came from St Edmund's College, a seminary founded in 1793 by English refugees from the French revolution.  The main disabilities, as referenced above, were lifted by the Catholic Relief Act of 1829. In 1850 the pope restored the Catholic hierarchy, giving England its own Catholic bishops again. In 1869 a new seminary opened.

Another, larger group comprised very poor Irish immigrants escaping the Great Irish Famine. Their numbers rose from 224,000 in 1841 to 419,000 in 1851, concentrated in ports and industrial districts as well as industrial districts in Scotland. A third group included well-known converts from the Church of England, most notably the intellectuals John Henry Newman and Henry Edward Manning (1808–1892). Manning became the second Archbishop of Westminster. The next most prominent leader was Herbert Vaughan (1832–1903), who succeeded Manning as Archbishop of Westminster in 1892 and was elevated to the cardinalate in 1893.

Manning was among the strongest supporters of the pope and especially of the doctrine of papal infallibility. In contrast Cardinal Newman acknowledged this doctrine but thought it might not be prudent to define it formally at the time. Manning promoted a modern Catholic view of social justice. These views are reflected in the papal encyclical Rerum novarum issued by Pope Leo XIII, which became the foundation of modern Catholic social justice teaching.  Catholic parochial schools, subsidised by the government, were set up in urban areas to serve the largely Irish element. Manning spoke for the Irish Catholic labourers and helped settle the London dock strike of 1889.  He gained acclaim for building a new cathedral in Westminster and for encouraging the growth of religious congregations largely filled by the Irish.

Converts
A number of prominent individuals have converted to the Catholic Church, including Edmund Campion, Margaret Clitherow, Charles II, John Henry Newman, Henry Edward Manning, Monsignor Robert Hugh Benson, Augustus Pugin, Evelyn Waugh, Muriel Spark, Gerard Manley Hopkins, Siegfried Sassoon, G. K. Chesterton, Ronald Knox, Graham Greene, Malcolm Muggeridge, Katharine, Duchess of Kent, Kenneth Clark, and Joseph Pearce. Members of the Royal family such as the Duchess of Kent and former Prime Minister Tony Blair have also converted to the Catholic Church, in Blair's case in December 2007 after he had left office.

Since the establishment of the Personal Ordinariate of Our Lady of Walsingham, over 3 ,000 former Anglicans have been received into the Catholic Church by this path.

Organisation
There are 38 ecclesiastical circumscriptions and 3,104 parishes.

Statistics

In 2011, in total there were roughly 5.7 million Catholics (9.1%) in the United Kingdom: 4,155,100 in England and Wales (7.4%), 841,053 in Scotland (15.9%), and 738,033 in Northern Ireland (40.76%).  According to a survey conducted by Pew Research Center in 2015-2017, 19% of adults in the UK identify themselves as Catholic.

In large parts of Northern Ireland, Catholicism is the dominant religion. Also in a few Scottish council areas Catholics outnumber other religions, including in the most populous one: Catholics outnumber members of the Church of Scotland in Glasgow City (27% versus 23%). Other council areas in which Catholics outnumber members of the Church of Scotland are North Lanarkshire, Inverclyde, and West Dunbartonshire, according to the 2011 Scottish Census.

In 2011 according to a YouGov poll, 70% of British Catholics believed a woman should be able to have an abortion.  Some 90% of Catholic worshippers supported contraceptives being widely available.  
According to a 2015 YouGov poll, 50% of religious British Catholics supported same-sex marriage and 40% opposed it.  According to a Pew Research Center poll 78% of UK Catholics support same-sex marriage while 21% oppose it.  The same poll maintains that 86% of UK Catholics believe society should accept homosexuality, while 12% believe society should not accept homosexuality.

Catholic saints of the United Kingdom

Saints and Doctors of the Church, notable and Pre-Reformation:
 Alban (d. 251 or 304), protomartyr
 David (500–589), monk, bishop, and teacher
 Patrick (late 5th century), missionary, 'Apostle to Ireland'
 Augustine of Canterbury (d. 605), Professed Religious Priest of the Order of St Benedict, bishop
 Padarn, early 6th century, bishop
 Cuthbert (c. 634–687), missionary and bishop
 Æthelthryth (c. 636-679), Anglo-Saxon princess
 Bede (672?–735), Professed Religious Priest of the Order of St Benedict, Doctor of the Church
 Dunstan (909–988), abbot, bishop, archbishop
 Edward the Confessor (1003–1066), king
 Anselm (1033–1109), Professed Religious Priest of the Order of St Benedict, archbishop, Doctor of the Church
 Thomas Becket (1118–1170), bishop and martyr
 Richard of Chichester (1197–1253), bishop
 Simon Stock (1165–1265), Carmelite Friar

Saints from the period of the Reformation to the present:

 John Fisher – (1469–1535), Bishop of Rochester; Cardinal
 Thomas More – (1478–1535), Married Layperson of the Archdiocese of Westminster
 John Houghton – (1487–1535), Professed Priest of the Carthusians
 Robert Lawrence – (d. 1535), Professed Priest of the Carthusians
 Augustine Webster – (d. 1535), Professed Priest of the Carthusians
 Richard Reynolds – (d. 1535), Professed Priest of the Carthusians
 John Stone – (d. 1539), Professed Priest of the Augustinians
 Cuthbert Mayne – (1544–1577), Priest of the Apostolic Vicariate of England
 Edmund Campion – (1540–1581), Professed Priest of the Jesuits
 Ralph Sherwin – (1550–1581), Priest of the Apostolic Vicariate of England
 Alexander Briant – (1556–1581), Professed Priest of the Jesuits
 John Paine – (d. 1582), Priest of the Apostolic Vicariate of England
 Luke Kirby – (1549–1582), Priest of the Apostolic Vicariate of England
 Richard Gwyn – (1537–1584), Married Layperson of the Apostolic Vicariate of England
 Margaret Clitherow née Middleton – (1550–1586), Married Layperson of the Apostolic Vicariate of England
 Margaret Ward – (d. 1588), Layperson of the Apostolic Vicariate of England
 Edmund Gennings – (1567–1591), Priest of the Apostolic Vicariate of England
 Swithun Wells – (1536–1591), Priest of the Apostolic Vicariate of England
 Eustace White – (d. 1591), Priest of the Apostolic Vicariate of England
 Polydore Plasden – (d. 1591), Priest of the Apostolic Vicariate of England
 John Boste – (1543–1582), Priest of the Apostolic Vicariate of England
 Robert Southwell – (1561–1595), Professed Priest of the Jesuits
 Henry Walpole – (1558–1595), Professed Priest of the Jesuits
 Philip Howard – (1557–1595), Married Layperson of the Apostolic Vicariate of England
 John Jones – (1559–1598), Professed Priest of the Franciscan Friars Minor (Observants)
 John Rigby – (d. 1600), Layperson of the Apostolic Vicariate of England
 Anne Line née Higham – (1565–1601), Married Layperson of the Apostolic Vicariate of England
 Nicholas Owen – (1550–1606), Professed Priest of the Jesuits
 Thomas Garnet – (1575–1608), Professed Priest of the Jesuits
 John Roberts – (1576–1610), Professed Priest of the Benedictines
 John Almond – (1577–1612), Priest of the Apostolic Vicariate of England
 John Ogilvie – (1579–1615), Professed Priest of the Jesuits
 Edmund Arrowsmith – (1585–1628), Professed Priest of the Jesuits
 Edward Barlow – (1585–1641), Professed Priest of the Benedictines
 Bartholomew Roe – (1583–1642), Professed Priest of the Benedictines
 Henry Morse – (1595–1645), Professed Priest of the Jesuits
 John Southworth – (1592–1654), Priest of the Apostolic Vicariate of England
 William Plessington – (1637–1679), Priest of the Apostolic Vicariate of England
 Philip Evans – (1645–1679), Professed Priest of the Jesuits
 John Lloyd – (1630–1679), Priest of the Apostolic Vicariate of England
 John Henry Newman – (1801–1890), Professed Priest of the Oratory, Theologian, Philosopher, Cardinal
 John Wall – (1620–1679), Professed Priest of the Franciscan Friars Minor (Recollects)
 John Kemble – (1599–1679), Priest of the Apostolic Vicariate of England
 David Lewis – (1616–1679), Professed Priest of the Jesuits

Blesseds
 Margaret Pole –  (1473–1541), Martyr, Countess of Salisbury
 Dominic Barberi – (1792–1849), Professed Priest of the Passionists
 Ralph Crockett – (1550–1588), Seminary Priest and Martyr

Venerables
 Mary Potter – (1847–1913), Founder of the Little Company of Mary
 Margaret Sinclair – (1900–1925), Professed Religious of the Poor Clare Colettine Nuns
 Joan Ward – (1585–1645), Founder of the Institute of the Blessed Virgin Mary (Loreto Sisters) and Congregatio Iesu
 Elizabeth Prout - (1820–1864), Founder of the Sisters of the Cross and the Passion
 George Spencer - (1799–1864), Professed Priest of the Passionists

Servants of God
 Margaret Hallahan – (1802–1868), Founder of the Dominican Sisters of the English Congregation of Saint Catherine of Siena
 Frances Taylor – (1832–1900), Founder of the Poor Servants of the Mother of God
 Teresa Helena Higginson – (1844–1905), Layperson of the Archdiocese of Liverpool

See also

 Anti-Catholicism in the United Kingdom
 Catholic Schools (UK)
 List of Catholic dioceses in Great Britain
 List of Catholic dioceses in the United Kingdom
 List of Roman Catholic churches in the United Kingdom
 Personal Ordinariate of Our Lady of Walsingham
 Pope Benedict XVI's visit to the United Kingdom

England and Wales
 Catholic Church in England and Wales
 English Reformation
 List of English cardinals
 List of monastic houses in England
 List of monastic houses in Wales

Scotland
 Catholic Church in Scotland
 Scottish Reformation
 List of monastic houses in Scotland

Ireland
 Catholic Church in Ireland
 List of Catholic dioceses in Ireland
 Reformation in Ireland
 List of Catholic churches in Ireland
 List of monastic houses in Ireland

References

Further reading
 Beck, George Andrew, ed. The English Catholics, 1850–1950 (1950), scholarly essays 
 Corrin, Jay P. Catholic Progressives in England After Vatican II (University of Notre Dame Press; 2013) 536 pages; 
 Dures, Alan. English Catholicism, 1558–1642: Continuity and Change (1983) 
 Harris, Alana. Faith in the Family: A Lived Religious History of English Catholicism, 1945–1982 (2013);  the impact of the Second Vatican Council on the ordinary believer 
  Heimann, Mary. Catholic Devotion in Victorian England (1995) online
  Hughes, Philip. The Catholic Question, 1688–1829: A Study in Political History (1929) 
  Latourette, Kenneth Scott. Christianity in a Revolutionary Age. Vol. I: The 19th Century in Europe; Background and the Roman Catholic Phase (1958), pp 451–59  
  Latourette, Kenneth Scott. Christianity in a Revolutionary Age. Vol. IV: The 20th Century in Europe; The Roman Catholic, Protestant and Eastern Churches (1961)  pp 210–20
 McClelland, Vincent Alan. Cardinal Manning: the Public Life and Influences, 1865–1892 (1962)
  Mathew, David. Catholicism in England: the portrait of a minority: its culture and tradition (1955) 
 Mullet, Michael. Catholics in Britain and Ireland, 1558–1829 (1998) 236pp 
  Watkin, E. I Roman Catholicism in England from the Reformation to 1950 (1957)

Primary sources
 Mullet, Michael. English Catholicism, 1680–1830 (2006)  2714 pages
 Newman, John Henry. Lectures on the Present Position of Catholics in England (University of Notre Dame Press, 2000) 585pp; based on 6th edition of 1889

External links
Catholic Church in England and Wales
Catholic Church in Ireland
Catholic Church in Scotland
Holy See — Vatican's official website
Directory of all Catholic Churches, Schools, Religious Houses and Organisations in the United Kingdom

 
United Kingdom
Religion in the United Kingdom